William Morice (c. 1500 – 17 January 1554) was an English politician.

He was a Member (MP) of the Parliament of England for Downton in 1547, West Looe in March 1553 and Liskeard in October 1553.

References

1500 births
1554 deaths
Members of the pre-1707 English Parliament for constituencies in Cornwall
English MPs 1547–1552
English MPs 1553 (Edward VI)
English MPs 1553 (Mary I)